"Level 42" is the first single by Japanese pop singer Kaela Kimura, released on June 23, 2004. It peaked at number fourteen on the Japan Oricon singles chart.

Track listing

References

Kaela Kimura songs
2004 debut singles
Japanese-language songs
Songs written by Kaela Kimura
2004 songs